Høyforsmoen is a small village in the municipality of Beiarn in Nordland county, Norway. Høyforsmoen Chapel is located in this village. The lake Ramsgjelvatnet lies northeast of the village.

References

Beiarn
Villages in Nordland
Populated places of Arctic Norway